The Ontario Provincial Confederation of Regions Party is a minor political party in Ontario, Canada, the provincial branch of the now-defunct Confederation of Regions Party of Canada. The party was founded in 1989, around the time the federal CoR was dissolved, and remains the last Confederation of Regions Party in Canada.

The CoR survives only in Ontario, though once a national movement whose original raison d'être was to promote the rights of regions other than Ontario and Quebec, now it advocates for regions within Ontario. It has reinvented itself twice: in the 1990s, first in campaigning across mainly rural regions of Ontario with targeted policies, before in the 2000s finding resonance in Northern Ontario and Northeastern Ontario, where it continues to play a minor role in provincial elections.

Party platform 

The party campaigns on the promotion of direct democracy, protection of Canadian heritage and environmental sustainability, while opposing urban sprawl onto farmland, big business and unionization. The party's proposed health care plan would "give individuals more responsibility over their own health care", however, it would not support a two-tier health care system.

If elected, the party would hold a referendum on the French Language Services Act, and halt all multicultural funding.

Election results 
Results of recent elections for the Legislative Assembly of Ontario:

In the 1990 election, CoR candidates in Algoma, Cochrane South, Nickel Belt, Sudbury, Sudbury East and Sault Ste. Marie placed ahead of Ontario Progressive Conservative Party candidates. The party rapidly declined in popularity, receiving about 0.1% with only 6 candidates province-wide vote in 1995, and then less than 0.01% of the province wide popular vote in the 2 registered candidate 1999, 1 registered candidate 2003, 2 registered candidate 2007, 3 registered candidate 2011, 2 registered candidate 2014 and the 2 registered candidate 2018 elections.

Typical of that 1999-2018 era was the 2014 General Election. The party was only able to field two candidates in the 2014 election. Fauzia Sadiq, the party's candidate in Timmins—James Bay campaigned on a platform of eliminating property taxes, cutting government positions & introducing two-year term limits. Sadiq received 61 votes. The party's only other candidate was long-time candidate and party president Murray Reid in Renfrew—Nipissing—Pembroke who received 490 votes.

However, heading towards the June 2nd, 2022, General Election in the Province of Ontario, of the province's 124 constituencies, the party has 3 organized constituency associations and all 3 associations are offering candidates for this 2022 election, according to Elections Ontario. That same election administration body reports that the coming June 2022 will feature 26 registered political parties of which 4 parties are seen as "major" parties. Thus of the remaining 22 "minor" parties, according to Elections Ontario data, as a "minor" party, CoR is able to maintain more organized constituency associations than 12 of those 22 "minor" parties, thus making CoR a "Top Half" "minor" party, organization-wise, in the province.

The party failed to win any seats in the 2022 Ontario general election.

Party leaders 
Dean Wasson has been the party's only leader, heading the party in the 1990 election. The party has not fielded a leader in any subsequent election, considering itself to be a grass roots organization, and will choose a leader if the party wins seats. The party's one candidate nominated in the 2003 election, Richard Butson, was cited as the de facto leader. After Butson's death in 2015, Eileen Butson was named as president of the party.
Murray Reid is now referred as the de facto leader of the party and president as of 2018.

References

See also 

 Ontario Provincial Confederation of Regions Party official website

Provincial political parties in Ontario
Conservative parties in Canada
Political parties established in 1989
1989 establishments in Ontario
Nationalist parties in Canada
Right-wing populism in Canada